Meat Is Murder is the second studio album by English rock band the Smiths, released on 11 February 1985 by Rough Trade Records. It became the band's only studio album to reach number one on the UK Albums Chart, and stayed on the chart for 13 weeks. The album was an international success: it spent 11 weeks in the European Top 100 Albums chart, peaking at number 29. It also reached number 110 on the US Billboard 200, in the United States.

Writing and recording
After the band's 1984 debut studio album, lead vocalist Morrissey and guitarist Johnny Marr produced the album themselves, assisted only by engineer Stephen Street. They had first met Stephen Street on the session for "Heaven Knows I'm Miserable Now" and requested his contact number. Officially, the record's production is credited to "The Smiths".

To build the album's soundscape, Morrissey provided Marr and Street with his personal copies of BBC sound effects records from which to source samples. Morrissey would continue this practice on future Smiths singles and albums.

Meat Is Murder was more strident and political than its predecessor, including the pro-vegetarian title track (Morrissey forbade the rest of the band from being photographed eating meat), and the anti-corporal punishment "The Headmaster Ritual". Musically, the band had grown more adventurous, with Marr and Rourke channelling rockabilly and funk influences in "Rusholme Ruffians" and "Barbarism Begins at Home", respectively. "Rusholme Ruffians" interpolates the Victoria Wood song "Fourteen Again". Author John King has suggested that the title track was inspired by the 1983 song "Meat Means Murder" by the anarcho-punk band Conflict, which deals with the same topic and also opens at a slow pace.

Morrissey also brought a political stance to many of his interviews. Among his targets were the Thatcher administration, the monarchy, and his musical contemporaries. When asked about Band Aid, which was being strongly promoted in the UK media at the time, he quipped, "One can have great concern for the people of Ethiopia, but it's another thing to inflict daily torture on the people of England". Similarly, he began to promote vegetarianism in live shows and interviews, on one occasion convincing a Scottish TV show to air footage of slaughterhouses during the dinner hour.

Cover art
The album's sleeve uses a 1967 photograph of an American marine, Cpl. Michael Wynn, in Vietnam, though with the wording on his helmet changed from "Make War Not Love" to "Meat Is Murder". The original image was used for Emile de Antonio's 1968 Oscar-nominated documentary In the Year of the Pig. Wynn stated in 2019 that he was never asked permission for the use of the photo, and that he "wasn’t real happy" that the wording on the helmet was changed.

Legacy
In 2003, Meat Is Murder was ranked number 295 on Rolling Stone magazine's list of The 500 Greatest Albums of All Time, and 296 in a 2012 revised list.  The album was also included in the book 1001 Albums You Must Hear Before You Die (2005).

Use in other media
In 2016, animal rights advocacy group PETA released a video game titled This Beautiful Creature Must Die, based on the song "Meat Is Murder". The game, which featured a chiptune rendition of the song, tasked players with clicking on their screens before different kinds of animals get chopped up in a death spiral.

Track listing

Note
 "How Soon Is Now?" was added to the American edition and to post-1992 UK WEA re-issues, as the first song on side 2 of the LP, or track 6 on all digital formats. The 2011 remaster restored the original UK track listing.

Personnel

The Smiths
 Morrissey – vocals
 Johnny Marr – guitars, piano, slide guitar , sound effects 
 Andy Rourke – bass guitar
 Mike Joyce – drums, tambourine, congas 

Production
 The Smiths – production
 Stephen Street – engineering, sound effects 
 Tim Young – mastering

Design
 Caryn Gough – package layout
 Paul Slattery – group photo
 Toshi Yajima – Morrissey solo-shot

Charts

Certifications and sales

References

External links
 

The Smiths albums
1985 albums
Rough Trade Records albums
Sire Records albums
Vegetarian-related mass media